Plain City may refer to:

Plain City, Ohio, United States
Plain City, Utah, United States

See also

 Plain (disambiguation)